Ištaran (Ishtaran) was a Mesopotamian god who was the tutelary deity of the city of Der, a Sumerian city state positioned east of the Tigris on the border between Sumer and Elam. It is known that he was a judge deity, and his position in the Mesopotamian pantheon was most likely high, but much about his character remains uncertain. He was associated with snakes, especially with the snake god Nirah, and it is possible that he could be depicted in a partially or fully serpentine form himself.

Name
The reading Ištaran has been established as correct by Wilfred G. Lambert in 1969. Other, now obsolete, proposals included Sataran, Satran, Gusilim, and Eatrana. Also attested are a variant form, Iltaran, and an Emesal one, Ezeran (or Ezzeran).

It is commonly assumed that Ištaran's name originated in a Semitic language. It has been proposed that it was etymologically related to Ishtar. Christopher Woods suggests that the suffix -an should be understood as plural, and translates the name as "the two Ishtars," possibly referring to the morning and evening star. He suggests that Ištaran was formed through syncretism of an Ishtar-like deity and a local snake god. However, the linguistic association between the names Ištaran and Ishtar is not universally accepted. Richard L. Litke instead assumes that Ištaran's name was Elamite in origin due to the location of Der, and that it was difficult to render for Mesopotamian scribes as a result.

The name could be written as dKA.DI or dMUŠ. The latter logogram could also designate the messenger (šipru) of Ištaran, Nirah, as well as the tutelary god of Susa, Inshushinak, the tutelary god of Eshnunna, Tishpak, and the primordial river deity Irḫan. With a different determinative, mulMUŠ, it referred to the constellation Hydra, which could be associated with Ištaran. Sometimes dDI.KU was used to render the name Ištaran as well, though these signs were also used to designate other judge deities, such as Mandanu and Diku (the deification of the Sumerian word "judge"). 

Ištaran could also be called Anu Rabû or AN.GAL, "Great Anu." In Elamite sources, the signs AN.GAL instead designate the god Napirisha, in the past incorrectly believed to be the same deity as Humban. Wouter Henkelman proposes a connection between these two deities based on this similarity, as well as their shared affinity with snakes and the fact that Der was located close to Elam.

Character
Ištaran's character is poorly understood, even though he belonged to a "very high level in the pantheon." It is known that he was primarily viewed as a divine judge. His just character was regarded as proverbial, and kings such as Gudea of Lagash and Shulgi of Ur compared themselves to him in inscriptions to present themselves as equally just. An Old Babylonian adab song makes a similar comparison with Nergal in place of a king.

He was also viewed as one of the Dumuzi-like mourned dying gods, as attested in Sumerian litanies and in a late ritual from Assur, according to which his death took place in the summer. The latter text states that his corpse was beaten and the blood reached the underworld. In one text, he and Dumuzi are outright equated with each other.

According to Wilfred G. Lambert, a well attested attribute of Ištaran was his beautiful face. For example, a lament refers to him as "bright-eyed." He was also associated with snakes. It is possible that depictions of these animals on kudurru (boundary stones) represented him as a judge deity resolving conflicts over land. Frans Wiggermann additionally assumes that a god depicted with the upper body of a human and the lower body of a snake, known from cylinder seals from the Sargonic period, might be Ištaran. Other researchers propose that this figure is Nirah. Wiggermann argues this is implausible, as Nirah was a servant deity, while the snake god is depicted as an "independent lord." He also notes a similar figure, though seated on a serpent throne rather than directly partially serpentine himself, is also present on seals from Susa, and might represent Inshushinak. He argues that both of these gods, as well as other deities, such as Ninazu, Ningishzida, Tishpak and the so-called boat god belonged to a group he refers to as "transtigridian snake gods." He assumes all of them developed on the boundary between Sumero-Akkadian and Elamite culture. In the god list An = Anum all of them appear in sequence, following Ereshkigal, which according to Wiggermann indicates that they were regarded as underworld deities.

Based on Ištaran's alternate name, Anu Rabû, it has also been proposed that he was associated with the sky. In a temple hymn, he is referred to as lugal dubur anna, "lord of the base of heaven."

Associations with other deities
Ištaran could be viewed as a son of Anu and Urash, and as a result the Old Babylonian Nippur god list associates him with Uruk. Martin Stol assumes that both Ištaran and  Inshushinak were regarded as sons of Tishpak by the compiler of the god list An = Anum. A list of city gods from Ur groups them together. A late ritual known from Assur addresses Ishtar as Ištaran's sister.

In the god list An = Anum, Ištaran appears without a wife, but in an inscription of Esarhaddon this role is assigned to the goddess Šarrat-Deri, "Queen of Der," or Deritum, "she of Der." There is also some evidence that Manzat, the goddess of the rainbow, was viewed as his wife. Frans Wiggermann identifies the source documenting this tradition as a "late theological text."

Nirah was the messenger (šipru) of Ištaran. He could also be viewed as his son. The god Zīzānu was either another son of Ištaran or a son of Qudma, his sukkal (attendant deity). Further members of his court include the deities Rāsu, Turma and  Itūr-mātiššu.

An association between Ištaran and Utu/Shamash, based on both of them being deities of justice, is already attested in the oldest texts from Abu Salabikh, and later recurs for example in inscriptions of Gudea.

Syncretism
A bilingual Hurro-Akkadian version of the Weidner god list from Emar seemingly regards Ištaran, misspelled as dKA.DI.DI (possibly an example of dittography, an error involving reduplication of a sign)  and Kumarbi (usually associated with Enlil or Syrian Dagan) as equivalents. Frank Simons assumes that this connection might be based on their shared association with the underworld, on shared perception as the "Father of Gods" (a prayer to Nisaba refers to dMUŠ as "father of the gods," though direct references to Ištaran in such a role are not known), or possibly on an unknown myth about Ištaran which resembled the Hurrian myths pertaining to Kumarbi's dethroning. 

It is possible that in the late first millennium, attempts at syncretising Istaran and Anu were made during a period of cooperation between the theologians from Uruk, Nippur and Der, but direct evidence is presently lacking.

A late god list equating various deities with Marduk mentions Anu Rabû among them, but the translation of the explanatory line is uncertain.

In tablet III of the "Myth of Anzû," Ištaran is given as one of the names of Ninurta along with other names of deities that are claimed to be equivalents of him in this composition, namely Zababa, Pabilsag, Inshushinak (described as bēl pirišti, "lord of secrets"), Ninazu, Panigara (an alternate spelling of the name Panigingarra), Ḫurabtil (labeled as an Elamite god), Lugal-Marada, and even Lugalbanda (a legendary king of Uruk) and Papsukkal (a messenger god, sukkal of Zababa). Andrew R. George suggests that based on their placement in documents such as the Canonical Temple List, it is possible that some of these gods - Ištaran, Inshushinak, Zababa and Lugal-Marada - could be seen as "local manifestations" of Ninurta by the ancient theologians responsible for compilation of such texts. Michael P. Streck emphasizes that such associations would be typical mostly for late theology.

Worship
Ištaran was the tutelary god of Der. His temple was the E-dimgalkalamma, "House, Great Bond of the Land." It already existed during the reign of Shulgi, who patronized it. It was rebuilt during the reign of one of the two Kassite kings bearing the Kurigalzu (Kurigalzu I or Kurigalzu II). Later it was destroyed in an Elamite invasion during the reign of Enlil-nadin-šumi, but Esarhaddon subsequently restored it. The temple also had a library attached to it, and the scribes of Der were in contact with those from Uruk and Babylon. However, as of 2010, only seven tablets whose colophons state they originate in Der are known. 

Oldest attestations of Ištaran are royal inscriptions from the Early Dynastic period from Lagash and Umma. According to an inscription of Entemena, Mesalim of Kish at the command of Ištaran demarcated the border between these two states, represented by their gods Ningirsu and Shara. It has been proposed that Ištaran was understood as a neutral party, similarly to Dagan in Syria, and as such as a suitable deity to ask for resolution of such conflicts. Another king from the Early Dynastic period, Lugalzagesi, called himself a "beloved friend of Ištaran."

Evidence for the worship of Ishtaran in the Sargonic period includes a mace head dedicated to him by Naram-Sin of Akkad, found in Ur, and theophoric names from Adab, such as Ur-Ištaran. Gudea, who reigned after the fall of the Akkadian Empire, in an inscription compared himself to Ištaran, asserting that like him he would declare just judgments not only for Sumerians and Akkadians, but even for "a brute from Gutium." A daughter of Shulgi, who reigned in the following Ur III period bore the name ME-Ištaran (reading of the first element uncertain). She is known from an archive recording matters related to her estate in Garshana. She was married to a certain Shu-Kabta, a man who was apparently both a physician and a military official. 

The formula "favorite of Ištaran, beloved of Inanna" (migir Ištaran, naram Inanna) was used by the viceroys of Der Ilum-muttabil (also read Anum-Muttabil), Nidnuša, and a third holder of this office whose name is not preserved, who reigned during Der's period of independence after the fall of the Third Dynasty of Ur. An inscription of Ilum-Muttabil indicates that he dedicated a new construction project to Ištaran too, but it is unknown if it refers to a temple. 

An inscription of the Assyrian king Ilu-šūma, mentions Ištaran and his city in passing. This text is the oldest known reference to cities other than Assur in Assyrian royal inscriptions. In later periods Ištaran was worshiped in the treasury of the E-šarra temple in Assur.

In the Old Babylonian period, a man bearing the theophoric name Ištaran-nasir was a merchant active in Carchemish and was in contact with Zimri-Lim, the king of Mari, informing him about events such as a festival of Nubandag and the death of king Aplahanda.

Multiple people bearing theophoric names invoking Ištaran (dKA.DI or AN.GAL) are attested in the documents of the First Sealand dynasty. Ran Zadok proposes that these individuals originally came from Der. Similarly, It has been argued names from other archives invoking Zababa can be assumed to indicate emigration of the inhabitants of Kish to other parts to Mesopotamia, Lagamal names might point at origin of the families of persons bearing them in Dilbat, while Tishpak names belonged to inhabitants of Eshnunna.

Ištaran appears in an inscription from Susa from the reign of one of the two Kassite rulers bearing the name Kurigalzu, and possibly in another from Babylon also attributed to one of them. Ištaran appears in eleven theophoric names from Nippur from the Kassite period under his own name, while further five names invoke Anu Rabû. He appears in eleven theophoric names from Nippur from the Kassite period under his own name, while further five names invoke Anu Rabû. Ištaran (dKA.DI) is also one of the few Mesopotamian gods attested in linguistically Kassite theophoric names, which mostly invoke Kassite deities. He also appears in the Elamite name Kuk-Ištaran, "protection of Ištaran."

An inscription of king Marduk-nadin-ahhe of the Second Dynasty of Isin mentions Anu Rabû as the last god in a long sequence of deities, immediately after Ishara.

is still attested in Der during the reign of Esarhaddon, and he most likely continued to be worshiped there until the city was deserted in either the Seleucid or Parthian period. While in the past it was assumed that no theophoric names invoking him are known from later than the Kassite period, more recent research shows that scribes from Der still bore such names in the late first millennium BCE.

Mythology
A fragmentary text known Abu Salabikh and Ebla mentions a group consisting of Shamash, Ištaran, the river god dÍD  and Nammu. Like Ištaran and Shamash, dÍD was a divine judge, and Nammu's presence might be the result of association between him and this goddess attested elsewhere.

The composition Hymn to Nanshe mentions Ištaran in his role of a divine judge, possibly in association with Ningishzida.

Ištaran is also mentioned in the Epic of Erra, where he forsakes the inhabitants of Der after they start acting violently. He is also the only deity to resist Erra's destructive rampage.

A neo-Assyrian copy of a lament originally dealing only with the death of Damu contains the names of nine deities who met this fate, including Ištaran.

References

Bibliography

External links

Ancient Mesopotamian Gods and Goddesses: Ištaran (god)

Mesopotamian gods
Justice gods
Snake gods